Crystal Canyon may refer to:

Places
 Crystal Canyon (Utah), a small canyon in the western slopes of the East Tintic Mountains in Juab County, Utah, United States
 A feature of the Grand Canyon, Arizona
 A canyon in Colorado; see South Fork Crystal River

Entertainment
 Crystal Canyon Studio, co-founded by Knut Schreiner
 "Crystal Canyon", a song by Irish band God Is an Astronaut from the 2006 album A Moment of Stillness
 "Crystal Canyon", an episode of the 1985 TV series Thundercats